Stephen Maher (born 3 March 1988) is an Irish footballer and coach.

Club career
Maher spent time at Home Farm, Cherry Orchard, Shelbourne and Dublin City, where he first tasted the League of Ireland experience, featuring a number of times on the bench towards the end of the season as they eventually secured promotion from the First Division. Having had the opportunity to stay on for the Premier Division campaign, Maher had trials at Portsmouth and Reading.

In June 2006, he signed his first professional contract when penning a two-year deal with English League One club Yeovil Town. The following January, he made his debut against Nottingham Forest, as a late substitute at the City Ground. Shortly after, he had a two-month loan spell at Shamrock Rovers. After exploring the possibility of leaving Huish Park, Maher returned to the first team in March 2008. However, having been influential in their final games of the season, he was surprisingly released.

After trials at various clubs, Maher joined Conference side Salisbury City for a short spell in November 2008. In early 2009, he agreed a move to League of Ireland club St Patrick's Athletic, going on to enjoy a fine UEFA Europa League run as they defeated Valletta (Malta) – the opening leg seeing Maher pick up the Man of the Match award – and Krylia Sovetov (Russia) before bowing out to Steaua Bucharest (Romania).

In February 2010, he moved to Dundalk and, having been deployed as a right-back with the Saints, he reverted to his preferred midfield role at Oriel Park. He was a key figure in Dundalk's rise to the top of the league in the early months of the season. However, Europe took its toll on the side and Maher, and at the end of July he was sidelined with osteitis pubis. That was not before earning the Man of the Match award following an outstanding performance as captain – aged just 22 – against Levski Sofia (Bulgaria) in the second leg of their UEFA Europa League tie. Dundalk had defeated Grevenmacher (Luxembourg) in the opening round.

He returned towards the end of the season but, having earned a new contract, his injury nightmare persisted throughout 2011. With a change of manager at the club, Maher left and signed for Monaghan United ahead of the 2012 season. However, having found full fitness, Monaghan announced on 18 June that they would be withdrawing from the league, leaving 24-year-old Maher as a free agent.

A brief return to Dundalk until the end of the season was next for Maher before he signed for another of his old clubs, St Patrick's Athletic for the 2013 season, on 5 March 2013. In September 2014 while on as a substitute against Derry City Maher suffered a broken leg which forced him to miss the rest of the season.

On 12 March 2014 he signed for Robbie Horgan and Drogheda United. He made his debut two days later coming on as a second-half substitute against Bohemians.

International career
At international level, Maher was capped at U18 level against Hungary before making his U21 debut in the Inter Continental Cup in Malaysia in 2008, playing against Malaysia, Australia and Nigeria. He was also called up to the U23 squad in October 2010 but was forced to pull out due to injury.

Honours
St Patrick's Athletic
League of Ireland (1): 2013

References

External links
 

1988 births
Living people
Republic of Ireland association footballers
Association football midfielders
Republic of Ireland under-21 international footballers
English Football League players
League of Ireland players
Home Farm F.C. players
Shelbourne F.C. players
Dublin City F.C. players
Yeovil Town F.C. players
Shamrock Rovers F.C. players
St Patrick's Athletic F.C. players
Dundalk F.C. players
Monaghan United F.C. players
Drogheda United F.C. players
Cherry Orchard F.C. players